Giuliano Tadeo Aranda, better known as Magrão (born 21 February 1974), is a former Brazilian football player.

Magrão played for several clubs in Brazil during his playing career. He also had a brief spell in the Spanish Segunda División with CD Badajoz. He finished his playing career with J. League side Gamba Osaka.

Club statistics

References

External links

jsgoal
WEB SOCCER MAGAZINE

1974 births
Living people
Brazilian footballers
Brazilian expatriate footballers
Sociedade Esportiva Palmeiras players
Goiás Esporte Clube players
Coritiba Foot Ball Club players
Grêmio Foot-Ball Porto Alegrense players
Botafogo de Futebol e Regatas players
Associação Desportiva São Caetano players
Expatriate footballers in Japan
Expatriate footballers in Spain
Campeonato Brasileiro Série A players
Segunda División players
J1 League players
Tokyo Verdy players
Gamba Osaka players
CD Badajoz players
Association football forwards